Kampong Bunut Perpindahan (also Kampong Perpindahan Bunut) is a village in Brunei-Muara District, Brunei, as well as a neighbourhood in the capital Bandar Seri Begawan. The population was 1,707 in 2016. It is one of the villages within Mukim Kilanas. The postcode is BF1220.

Name 
The name 'Bunut Perpindahan' (sometimes 'Perpindahan Bunut') literally means 'Bunut Resettlement' and is named after its residential area which has been one of the housing estates under the National Resettlement Scheme, as well as its location being near Kampong Bunut, the original settlement of the name.

History 
The settlement was first established in 1951 as the first housing estate under the Resettlement Programme, a government programme for the resettlement of Kampong Ayer residents to land. The first several families who resettled in Bunut Perpindahan were originally the inhabitants of Kampong Pengiran Bendahara Lama, a neighbourhood in Kampong Ayer. They were given incentives to built new homes and additional plot of land for agriculture as new means of sustenance.

See also 

 Kampong Bunut
 Kampong Tanjong Bunut
 List of public housing estates in Brunei

References 

Neighbourhoods in Bandar Seri Begawan
Villages in Brunei-Muara District
Public housing estates in Brunei